Walpole Public Schools is a school district serving Walpole, Massachusetts.

In 2012, voters approved a budget override. Jean Kenney, the assistant superintendent, stated in 2015 that the district would have closed its middle school foreign languages program if the override did not pass, and that parents who wanted foreign language instruction to remain had passed the override.

Schools
 Walpole High School
Middle schools:
 Bird Middle School
 Eleanor M. Johnson Middle School

Elementary schools:
 Boyden School
 Elm Street School
 Fisher School
 Old Post Road School

Preschools:
Daniel Feeney Preschool Center

References

External links
 Walpole Public Schools

School districts in Massachusetts
Walpole, Massachusetts
Education in Norfolk County, Massachusetts